Dennis Hayden Cambal (January 27, 1949 – September 9, 2018) was an American football player for the National Football League's New York Jets. He played the running back position in college at William & Mary.  He was drafted by the Oakland Raiders in the 14th round of the 1972 NFL Draft and was placed on their taxi squad for the 1972 season but then was cut.  The Jets signed him as a free agent before the 1973 season and he made the team, playing in 8 games mostly as a tight end and on special teams. He missed 5 games in October and November due to an injury he suffered in the Jets' October 21 game against the Pittsburgh Steelers.  In 1974 he crossed the Jets' picket line during the 1974 NFL strike during the preseason, but was waived before the regular season started.

He died on September 9, 2018, in Barnstable, Massachusetts at age 69.

References

1949 births
2018 deaths
American football running backs
New York Jets players
Players of American football from Massachusetts
William & Mary Tribe football players
Sportspeople from Waltham, Massachusetts